Alirajpur Tehsil is a fourth-order administrative and revenue division, a subdivision of third-order administrative and revenue division of Alirajpur district of Madhya Pradesh.

Geography
Alirajpur tehsil has an area of 626.69 sq kilometers. It is bounded by Bhavra tehsil in the northeast, Jobat tehsil in the east, Dhar district in the southeast, Maharashtra in the south and Gujarat in the southwest, west, northwest and north.

See also 
Alirajpur district

References

External links

Tehsils of Madhya Pradesh
Alirajpur district